Texas Wildlife Management Areas are divided into seven regions of the Texas Parks and Wildlife Department with the goal of managing and conserving the natural and cultural resources of Texas. There are  under management of the Division of Wildlife often referred to as a WMA.

WMA areas
Area 1: Panhandle/High Plains Wildlife District includes five WMAs
Area 2: Prairies and Lakes
Area 3: Pineywoods
Area 4: Gulf Coast
Area 5: South Texas Plains
Area 6: Hill Country
Area 7: Big Bend Country

There is some confusion as there are also listed eight Wildlife Management Areas that roughly coincide with the 10 ecoregions.

Trans Pecos
High Plains/Panhandle
Cross Timbers
Hill Country
Post Oak Savannah
Pineywoods
Oak Prairie
South Texas Plains

WMA list
The following are all designated Wildlife Management Areas (WMAs) in Texas:

References

 
Hunting in the United States
Recreational fishing in the United States
Wildlife Management Areas
Texas